Jandarm (Gendarme) is the lowest rank in the Romanian Gendarmerie. It is the equivalent of soldat in the Romanian Army.

In day do day usage, the term jandarm denotes every man or woman enrolled into the Romanian Gendarmerie, irrespective of their actual rank.

Military ranks of Romania
Gendarmerie (Romania)